Ladda Tammy Duckworth (born March 12, 1968) is an American politician and retired Army National Guard lieutenant colonel serving as the junior United States senator from Illinois since 2017. A member of the Democratic Party, she represented Illinois's 8th congressional district in the United States House of Representatives from 2013 to 2017.

Born in Bangkok, Thailand, and raised in Honolulu, Hawaii, Duckworth was educated at the University of Hawaii at Manoa and George Washington University in Washington, D.C. A combat veteran of the Iraq War, she served as a U.S. Army helicopter pilot. In 2004, when her Black Hawk helicopter was hit by a rocket-propelled grenade fired by Iraqi insurgents, she lost both legs and some mobility in her right arm. She was the first female double amputee from the war. Despite her injuries, she was awarded a medical waiver to continue serving in the Illinois Army National Guard for another ten years until she retired as a lieutenant colonel in 2014.

Duckworth ran unsuccessfully for a seat in the United States House of Representatives in 2006, then served as director of the Illinois Department of Veterans Affairs from 2006 to 2009 and as assistant secretary for public and intergovernmental affairs at the United States Department of Veterans Affairs from 2009 to 2011. In 2012, Duckworth was elected to the U.S. House of Representatives, where she served two terms. She was elected to the U.S. Senate in 2016, defeating Republican incumbent Mark Kirk. 

Duckworth is the first Thai American woman elected to Congress, the first person born in Thailand elected to Congress, the first woman with a disability elected to Congress, the first female double amputee in the Senate, and the first senator to give birth while in office. Duckworth is the second of three Asian American women to serve in the U.S. Senate, after Mazie Hirono, and before Kamala Harris.

Early life and education
Duckworth was born in Bangkok, Thailand, the daughter of Franklin Duckworth and Lamai Sompornpairin. Although born outside the United States, Duckworth is a natural-born citizen through her father's status as an American citizen. Her father, who died in 2005, was a veteran of the U.S. Army and U.S. Marine Corps who traced his family's American roots to the American Revolutionary War. Her mother is Thai Chinese and originally from Chiang Mai. Her father was a Baptist who worked with the United Nations and international companies in refugee, housing, and development programs, and the family moved around Southeast Asia. Duckworth became fluent in Thai and Indonesian, in addition to English.

Duckworth attended Singapore American School, the International School Bangkok, and the Jakarta International School. The family moved to Honolulu, Hawaii, when Duckworth was 16, and she attended Honolulu's McKinley High School, where she participated in track and field and graduated in 1985. Because of a difference in the grade levels between the school systems she attended, Duckworth skipped half of her ninth grade year and half of her tenth. She was a Girl Scout, and earned her First Class, now called the Gold Award. Her father was unemployed for a time, and the family relied on public assistance. She graduated from the University of Hawaii at Manoa in 1989 with a Bachelor of Arts in political science. In 1992, she received a Master of Arts in international affairs from George Washington University's Elliott School of International Affairs. She began a PhD program at Northern Illinois University, which was interrupted by her war service. She completed a PhD in human services at Capella University School of Public Service Leadership in March 2015. Her dissertion was titled Exploring Illinois physicians' experience using electronic medical records (EMR) via the UTAUT model. Julia Moore was her facutly mentor.

Military service

Following in the footsteps of her father, who served in World War II and the Vietnam War, and ancestors who served in every major conflict since the Revolutionary War, Duckworth joined the Army Reserve Officers' Training Corps in 1990 as a graduate student at George Washington University. She became a commissioned officer in the United States Army Reserve in 1992 and chose to fly helicopters because it was one of the few combat jobs open to women at that time. As a member of the Army Reserve, she went to flight school, later transferring to the Army National Guard and in 1996 entering the Illinois Army National Guard. Duckworth also worked as a staff supervisor at Rotary International headquarters in Evanston, Illinois, and was the coordinator of the Center for Nursing Research at Northern Illinois University.

Duckworth was working toward a Ph.D. in political science at Northern Illinois University, with research interests in the political economy and public health of southeast Asia, when she was deployed to Iraq in 2004. She lost her right leg near the hip and her left leg below the knee from injuries sustained on November 12, 2004, when the UH-60 Black Hawk helicopter she was co-piloting was hit by a rocket-propelled grenade fired by Iraqi insurgents. She was the first American female double amputee from the Iraq War. The explosion severely broke her right arm and tore tissue from it, necessitating major surgery to repair it. Duckworth received a Purple Heart on December 3 and was promoted to the rank of major on December 21 at Walter Reed Army Medical Center, where she was presented with an Air Medal and Army Commendation Medal. She retired from the Illinois Army National Guard in October 2014 as a lieutenant colonel.

In 2011 the Daughters of the American Revolution erected a statue with Duckworth's likeness and that of Molly Pitcher in Mount Vernon, Illinois. The statue was dedicated to female veterans.

In 2019, Duckworth participated in the National Air and Space Museum's "The Military Women Aviators Oral History Initiative (MWAOHI)" project alongside fourteen other veteran women aviators, including Olga Custodio, Sarah Deal, Stayce Harris, Jeannie Leavitt, Nicole Malachowski, Sally Murply, Tammie Shults, Jacqueline Van Ovost, Lucy Young, and Kim "K. C." Campbell.

Government service

On November 21, 2006, several weeks after losing her first congressional campaign, Duckworth was appointed director of the Illinois Department of Veterans Affairs by Governor Rod Blagojevich. She served in that position until February 8, 2009. While director, she was credited with starting a program to help veterans with post-traumatic stress disorder (PTSD) and veterans with brain injuries.

On September 17, 2008, Duckworth attended a campaign event for Dan Seals, the Democratic candidate for Illinois's 10th congressional district. She used vacation time, but violated Illinois law by going to the event in a state-owned van that was equipped for a person with physical disabilities. She acknowledged the mistake and repaid the state for the use of the van.

In 2009, two Illinois Department of Veterans Affairs employees at the Anna Veterans' Home in Union County filed a lawsuit against Duckworth. The lawsuit alleged that she wrongfully terminated one employee and threatened and intimidated another for bringing reports of abuse and misconduct of veterans when she was head of the Illinois Department of Veterans Affairs. Duckworth was represented in the suit by the Illinois Attorney General's office. The case was dismissed twice but refilings were allowed. The case settled in June 2016 for $26,000 with no admission of wrongdoing. The plaintiffs later indicated they no longer wanted to settle, but the judge gave them 21 days to sign the settlement and canceled the trial.

On February 3, 2009, President Barack Obama nominated Duckworth to be the Assistant Secretary of Public and Intergovernmental Affairs for the United States Department of Veterans Affairs (VA). and the United States Senate confirmed her for the position on April 22. As Assistant Secretary, she coordinated a joint initiative with the U.S. Department of Housing and Urban Development to help end Veteran homelessness, worked to address the unique challenges faced by female as well as Native American Veterans, and created the Office of Online Communications to improve the VA's accessibility, especially among young Veterans. Duckworth resigned her position in June 2011 in order to launch her campaign for the U.S. House of Representatives in Illinois's 8th congressional district.

U.S. House of Representatives

Elections

2006

After longtime incumbent Republican Henry Hyde announced his retirement from Congress, several candidates began campaigning for the open seat. Duckworth won the Democratic primary with a plurality of 44%, defeating 2004 nominee Christine Cegelis with 40%, and Wheaton College professor Lindy Scott with 16%. State Senator Peter Roskam was unopposed in the Republican primary. For the general election, Duckworth was endorsed by EMILY's List, a political action committee that supports female Democratic candidates who back abortion rights. Duckworth was also endorsed by the Brady Campaign to Prevent Gun Violence and the Fraternal Order of Police. While she raised $4.5 million to Roskam's $3.44 million, Duckworth lost by 4,810 votes, receiving 49% to Roskam's 51%.

2012

In July 2011, Duckworth launched her campaign to run in 2012 for Illinois's 8th congressional district. She defeated former Deputy Treasurer of Illinois Raja Krishnamoorthi for the Democratic nomination on March 20, 2012, then faced incumbent Republican Joe Walsh in the general election. Duckworth received the endorsement of both the Chicago Tribune and the Daily Herald. Walsh generated controversy when in July 2012, at a campaign event, he accused Duckworth of politicizing her military service and injuries, saying "my God, that's all she talks about. Our true heroes, the men and women who served us, it's the last thing in the world they talk about." Walsh called the controversy over his comments "a political ploy to distort my words and distract voters" and said that "Of course Tammy Duckworth is a hero ... I have called her a hero hundreds of times."

On November 6, 2012, Duckworth defeated Walsh 55%–45%, making her the first Asian-American from Illinois in Congress, the first woman with a disability elected to Congress, and the first member of Congress born in Thailand.

2014

In the 2014 general election, Duckworth faced Republican Larry Kaifesh, a United States Marine Corps officer who had recently left active duty as a colonel. Duckworth defeated Kaifesh with 56% of the vote.

Tenure 
Duckworth was sworn into office on January 3, 2013.

On April 3, 2013, Duckworth publicly returned 8.4% ($1,218) of her congressional salary for that month to the United States Department of Treasury in solidarity with furloughed government workers.

On June 26, 2013, during a hearing of the House Oversight and Government Reform Committee, Duckworth received national media attention after questioning Strong Castle CEO Braulio Castillo on a $500 million government contract the company had been awarded based on Castillo's disabled veteran status. Castillo had injured his ankle at the US Military Academy's prep school, USMAPS, in 1984.

Committee assignments
 Committee on Armed Services
 Subcommittee on Tactical Air and Land Forces (2013–2017)
 Subcommittee on Oversight and Investigations (2013–2015)
 Subcommittee on Readiness (2015–2017)
 Committee on Oversight and Government Reform
 Subcommittee on Energy Policy, Health Care and Entitlements (2013–2015)
 Subcommittee on Economic Growth, Job Creation and Regulatory Affairs (2013–2015)
 Subcommittee on Transportation and Public Assets, Ranking Member (2015–2017)
 Subcommittee on Information Technology (2015–2017)
 United States House Select Committee on Benghazi (May 2014–July 2016)

U.S. Senate

Elections

2016 

On March 30, 2015, Duckworth announced that she would challenge incumbent Republican U.S. Senator Mark Kirk for his seat in the 2016 Senate election in Illinois. Duckworth defeated fellow Democrats Andrea Zopp and Napoleon Harris in the primary election on March 15, 2016.

During a televised debate on October 27, 2016, Duckworth talked about her ancestors' past service in the United States military. Kirk responded, "I'd forgotten that your parents came all the way from Thailand to serve George Washington." The comment led to the Human Rights Campaign withdrawing their endorsement of Kirk and switching it to Duckworth, stating his comments were "deeply offensive and racist."

Duckworth was endorsed by Barack Obama, who actively campaigned for her.

On November 8, Duckworth defeated Kirk 55 percent to 40 percent to win the Senate seat.  Duckworth and Kamala Harris, who was also elected in 2016, are the second and third female Asian American senators, after Mazie Hirono who was elected in 2012.

2022 

In March 2021, Duckworth announced her candidacy for reelection in the 2022 election. On November 8, 2022, Duckworth won her reelection to the U.S. Senate, defeating Republican challenger Kathy Salvi. Duckworth's win makes her the first woman reelected to a senate seat in Illinois.

Tenure

First term (2017–2023)
According to The Center for Effective Lawmaking (CEL), a joint partnership between the University of Virginia's Frank Batten School of Leadership and Public Policy and Vanderbilt University, Duckworth's "Legislative Effectiveness Score" (LES) is "Exceeds Expectations" as a freshman senator in the 115th Congress (2017–2018), the 11th highest out of 48 Democratic senators.

GovTrack's Report Card on Duckworth for the 115th Congress found that among Senate freshmen, she ranked first in favorably reporting bills out of committee and "Got influential cosponsors the most often compared to Senate freshmen." GovTrack also found that in the first session of the 116th Congress, Duckworth ranked first in favorably reporting bills out of committee and "Got influential cosponsors the most often compared to Senate sophomores."

During the 115th Congress, Duckworth was credited with saving the Americans with Disabilities Act. Specifically, she led public opposition to a controversial bill, H.R. 620, and led 42 senators in pledging to oppose any effort to pass H.R. 620 through the Senate. The Veterans Service Organization and Paralyzed Veterans of America recognized Duckworth's leadership in defending the Americans with Disabilities Act.

In January 2018, when the federal government shut down after the Senate could not agree on a funding bill, Duckworth responded to President Trump's accusations that the Democrats were putting "unlawful immigrants" ahead of the military: 

In 2018, Duckworth became the first U.S. senator to give birth while in office. Shortly afterward, the Senate passed Senate Resolution 463, which Duckworth introduced on April 12, 2018, by unanimous consent. The resolution changed Senate rules so that a senator may bring a child under one year old to the Senate floor during votes. The day after the rules were changed, Duckworth's daughter became the first baby on the Senate floor.

On April 15, 2020, the Trump administration invited Duckworth to join a bipartisan task force on the reopening of the economy amid the COVID-19 pandemic.

Duckworth was publicly critical of Trump's decision to nominate Amy Coney Barrett to the Supreme Court in September 2020. Barrett, a devout Catholic, is a member of a group that considers in vitro fertilization morally illicit. Duckworth said that Barrett's membership in such an organization was "disqualifying and, frankly, insulting to every parent". Both of Duckworth's children were conceived by IVF.

The Center for Effective Lawmaking, a joint initiative of the University of Virginia and Vanderbilt University, ranked Duckworth the fifth most effective Democratic senator in the 116th Congress and the most effective Democratic senator on transportation policy. Professors Craig Volden and Alan Wiseman, co-directors of the Center for Effective Lawmaking, stated, "While still in her first term, Senator Tammy Duckworth has risen to the top five among effective Democratic lawmakers in the Senate. She sponsored 77 bills in the 116th Congress, with four of them passing the Republican-controlled Senate and two becoming law."

On January 3, 2021, Duckworth received one vote for Speaker of the House of Representatives from Jared Golden despite not being a member of that legislative body and therefore not being a serious candidate.

Duckworth was participating in the certification of the 2021 United States Electoral College vote count when Trump supporters stormed the U.S. Capitol. In the wake of the attack, Duckworth called Trump "a threat to our nation" and called for his immediate removal from office through the invocation of the Twenty-fifth Amendment to the United States Constitution or impeachment. Two days later, on January 8, she also called for the resignation of Representative Mary Miller, who had quoted Adolf Hitler during a speech on January 5.

In June 2022, President Biden sent Duckworth to Taiwan, where she held a press conference with Tsai Ing-wen to announce the U.S.-Taiwan Initiative on 21st-Century Trade in the wake of fears of angering China by the other partners to the May 2022 Indo-Pacific trade agreement. Duckworth's mission was planned in conjunction with the U.S. Trade Representative's office, which leads the Initiative for Washington.

Duckworth is the sponsor of S. 3635, the Public Safety Officer Support Act of 2022, which would provide line of duty death designation to law enforcement and other public safety officers who die as a result of traumatic brain injury, PTSD, and other "silent" injuries. The bill is based on the death of Washington, D.C. police officer Jeffrey Smith in the aftermath of the January 6, 2021, Capitol attack. Smith died of post-concussive syndrome after suffering repeated attacks at the Capitol.

Second term (2023–present)
In February 2023, Duckworth was named chair of the Subcommittee on Aviation Safety, Operations and Innovation of the Committee on Commerce, Science, and Transportation. Along with Deb Fischer (R-NE), Duckworth sponsored a bill to improve reporting on complaints from disabled airline passengers.

Committee assignments

Current
 Committee on Armed Services (2019–present)
 Subcommittee on Airland
 Subcommittee on Readiness and Management Support
 Subcommittee on Strategic Forces
 Committee on Commerce, Science, and Transportation
 Subcommittee on Aviation Operations, Safety, and Security (Chair)
 Subcommittee on Communications, Technology, Innovation, and the Internet
 Subcommittee on Consumer Protection, Product Safety, Insurance and Data Security
 Subcommittee on Surface Transportation and Merchant Marine Infrastructure, Safety, and Security
 Committee on Foreign Relations (2023-present)
 Subcommittee on Multilateral International Development, Multilateral Institutions, and International Economic, Energy and Environmental Policy (Chair)
 Subcommittee on Europe and Regional Security Cooperation
 Subcommittee on East Asia, The Pacific, and International Cybersecurity Policy
 Committee on Small Business and Entrepreneurship

Previous
 Committee on Energy and Natural Resources (2017–2019)
 Committee on Environment and Public Works (2017-2023)

Caucus memberships
 Congressional Asian Pacific American Caucus
 Expand Social Security Caucus
 Senate Whistleblower Protection Caucus

National politics
Duckworth has spoken at the 2008, 2012, 2016, and 2020 Democratic National Conventions. She was the permanent co-chair of the 2020 Democratic National Convention. At the 2020 convention she called Trump "coward-in-chief" for not supporting the American military.

Duckworth was vetted as a possible running mate during Joe Biden's vice presidential candidate selection. Fellow U.S. Senator Kamala Harris was instead selected. Biden nominated Duckworth to serve as Vice Chair of the Democratic National Committee, along with Gretchen Whitmer, Keisha Lance Bottoms and Filemon Vela Jr.

Political positions

Environment 
In April 2019, Duckworth was one of 12 senators to sign a bipartisan letter to top senators on the Appropriations Subcommittee on Energy and Water Development advocating that the Energy Department be granted maximum funding for carbon capture, utilization and storage (CCUS), arguing that American job growth could be stimulated by investment in viable options to capture carbon emissions and expressing disagreement with Trump's 2020 budget request to combine the two federal programs that include carbon capture research.

Foreign policy

During her unsuccessful congressional campaign in 2006, Duckworth called on Congress to audit the estimated $437 billion spent on overseas military and foreign aid since September 11, 2001.

On September 30, 2006, Duckworth gave the Democratic Party's response to President George W. Bush's weekly radio address. In it, she was critical of Bush's strategy for the Iraq War.

In October 2006, The Sunday Times reported that Duckworth agreed with General Sir Richard Dannatt, the British Army chief, that the presence of coalition troops was exacerbating the conflict in Iraq.

Duckworth supports continued U.S. military aid to Israel and opposes the movement for Boycott, Divestment and Sanctions (BDS) against Israel. She voiced her opposition to Israel's plan to annex parts of the occupied West Bank.

In May 2019, Duckworth was a cosponsor of the South China Sea and East China Sea Sanctions Act, a bipartisan bill reintroduced by Marco Rubio and Ben Cardin that was intended to disrupt China's consolidation or expansion of its claims of jurisdiction over both the sea and air space in disputed zones in the South China Sea.

On June 6, 2021, Duckworth and Senators Dan Sullivan and Christopher Coons visited Taipei in an U.S. Air Force C-17 Globemaster III transport to meet President Tsai Ing-wen and Minister Joseph Wu during the pandemic outbreak of Taiwan to announce President Joe Biden's donation plan of 750,000 COVID-19 vaccines included in the global COVAX program.

Gun Control
Duckworth was rated by the National Rifle Association as having a pro-gun control congressional voting record. Duckworth, who is a gun owner herself, cites violence in Chicago as a major influence for her support of gun control. She supports universal background checks and the halting of state-to-state gun trafficking. Duckworth is a supporter of a national assault weapons ban.

Duckworth participated in the 2016 Chris Murphy gun control filibuster. During the 2016 United States House of Representatives sit-in, Duckworth hid her mobile phone in her prosthetic leg to avoid it being taken away from her since taking pictures and recording on the House floor is against policy.

In a 2016 interview with GQ magazine, Duckworth stated that gaining control of the Senate and "closing the gap" in the House would be necessary in order to pass firearm restrictions. She also stated that she believed moderate Republicans, who support gun control, would have more power to influence gun control if they were not "pushed aside by those folks who are absolutely beholden to the NRA. And so we never get the vote."

Health policy
Duckworth supports abortion rights. After Roe v. Wade was overturned in 2022, Duckworth said she was "outraged and horrified." She called the decision a "nightmare", robbing women of their right to make health care decisions.

Duckworth supported the Affordable Care Act.

Immigration
Duckworth supports comprehensive immigration reform with a pathway to citizenship for those in the country illegally. She would admit 100,000 Syrian refugees into the United States.

In August 2018, Duckworth was one of seventeen senators to sign a letter spearheaded by Kamala Harris to United States Secretary of Homeland Security Kirstjen Nielsen demanding that the Trump administration take immediate action in attempting to reunite 539 migrant children with their families, citing each passing day of inaction as intensifying "trauma that this administration has needlessly caused for children and their families seeking humanitarian protection."

Awards and accolades
In May 2010, Duckworth was awarded the Honorary degree of Doctor of Humane Letters (DHL) by Northern Illinois University. In 2011, Chicago's Access Living honored Duckworth for her work on behalf of veterans with disabilities, bestowing her with the Gordon H. Mansfield Congressional Leadership Award.

Duckworth is heavily decorated for her service in Iraq, with over 10 distinct military honors, most notably the Purple Heart, an award her Marine father had also received.

Former Republican presidential candidate and Senator from Kansas Bob Dole dedicated his autobiography One Soldier's Story in part to Duckworth. Duckworth credits Dole for inspiring her to pursue public service, while she recuperated at Walter Reed Army Medical Center; although, in 2006, Dole endorsed Duckworth's Republican opponent, Peter Roskam.

Personal life
Duckworth has been married to Bryan Bowlsbey since 1993. They met during Duckworth's participation in the Reserve Officers' Training Corps and later served together in the Illinois Army National Guard. Bowlsbey, a Signal Corps officer, is also a veteran of the Iraq War. Both have since retired from the armed forces.

Duckworth and Bowlsbey have two daughters: Abigail, who was born in 2014, and Maile, born in 2018. Maile's birth made Duckworth the first U.S. senator to give birth while in office. Former senator Daniel Akaka helped the couple with the naming of both daughters; Akaka died April 6, 2018, three days before Maile was born. Shortly after Maile's birth, a Senate rule change permitted senators to bring children under one year old on the Senate floor to breastfeed. This was a symbolic moment for Duckworth, as she had previously introduced the bipartisan Friendly Airports for Mothers (FAM) Act to ensure new mothers access to safe, clean and accessible lactation rooms in airports. The day after the rule change, Duckworth brought Maile with her during the casting of a Senate vote, making Duckworth the first senator to cast a vote while holding a baby.

Duckworth helped establish the Intrepid Foundation to help injured veterans.

Electoral history

Bibliography
 
 Every Day is a Gift: A Memoir, Little, Brown & Company, 2021.

See also
 List of Asian Americans and Pacific Islands Americans in the United States Congress
 List of United States senators born outside the United States
 Women in the United States House of Representatives
 Women in the United States Senate

References

External links

 Senator Tammy Duckworth official U.S. Senate website
 Tammy Duckworth for Senate campaign website
 
 

|-

|-

|-

|-

|-

|-

1968 births
21st-century American politicians
21st-century American women politicians
American amputees
United States Army personnel of the Iraq War
Members of the United States Congress of Chinese descent
American people of Thai descent
American politicians with disabilities
Democratic Party members of the United States House of Representatives from Illinois
Democratic Party United States senators from Illinois
Asian-American members of the United States House of Representatives
Asian-American United States senators
Women military aviators
Female members of the United States House of Representatives
Female United States senators
Elliott School of International Affairs alumni
American Senior Army Aviators
Illinois National Guard personnel
Living people
National Guard (United States) officers
Obama administration personnel
Tammy Duckworth
Politicians from Honolulu
People from Hoffman Estates, Illinois
Recipients of the Air Medal
Shot-down aviators
State cabinet secretaries of Illinois
Thai emigrants to the United States
United States Department of Veterans Affairs officials
University of Hawaiʻi at Mānoa alumni
Women in Illinois politics
Women in the Iraq War
Female United States Army officers
Recipients of the Meritorious Service Medal (United States)
Daughters of the American Revolution people
American women of Chinese descent in politics
Asian-American people in Illinois politics
Capella University alumni